Talkheh Zar (also Romanized as Talkheh Zār; also known as Talkhehzār) is a village in Tayebi-ye Sarhadi-ye Sharqi Rural District, Charusa District, Kohgiluyeh County, Kohgiluyeh and Boyer-Ahmad Province, Iran. At the 2006 census, its population was 77, in 11 families.

References 

Populated places in Kohgiluyeh County